Virgin Hotels is a brand of hotels created by Sir Richard Branson's Virgin Group, launched in 2010.

History
In October 2011 Virgin Hotels bought the 27-story Old Dearborn Bank Building in the Loop area of Chicago for $14.8 million from Urban Street Group LLC. On January 15, 2015 the first Virgin Hotel opened. In February 2019, Virgin Hotels opened at its second location in San Francisco, CA on 4th street, near to Yerba Buena Gardens. One element of Virgin Hotels' business plan was to acquire distressed properties in North America cheaply during the property downturn, but banks decided to hold distressed real-estate assets until the market for them rebounded rather than sell them so the company fell well behind its planned timetable.

Development
Further hotels are being planned in New York City and Nashville. The 300 room New York site will be located on the corner of 29th Street and Broadway. The 240 room Nashville property is to be located at One Music Row. The San Francisco hotel opened on 4th street in February 2019. The Dallas hotel which was the latest to open in December 2019 and is located in the Design District, near Downtown Dallas.

The British-based Virgin Hotels Group Limited owns the Virgin Limited Edition portfolio of properties that include luxury resorts such as Necker Island.

The group aims to have hotels in 9 locations by 2025. When asked about the operation, Virgin's Richard Branson said "There won’t be hidden charges, and you won’t get charged $10 for a chocolate bar you know you can buy at a store for $2." Branson has said the brand is geared toward the female business traveler.

In January 2018, rumours arose regarding Virgin's early negotiations toward purchasing the Hard Rock Hotel and Casino in Las Vegas. As of March 2018, Hard Rock Hotel and Casino is expected to be rebranded as Virgin Hotels Las Vegas by the end of 2019. 

On 5 May 2021, the Las Vegas hotel was opened to the general public.

Current locations

United States
Virgin Hotels Chicago (Chicago, Illinois)
Virgin Hotels Dallas (Dallas, Texas)
Virgin Hotels Las Vegas (Las Vegas, Nevada)
Virgin Hotels Nashville (Nashville, Tennessee)
Virgin Hotels New Orleans (New Orleans, Louisiana)
Virgin Hotels New York (New York, New York)

Scotland
Virgin Hotels Edinburgh (Edinburgh, Scotland)
Virgin Hotels Glasgow (Glasgow, Scotland)

Future locations

United States

Coming in 2025
Virgin Hotels Miami (Miami, Florida)

Former locations

United States
Virgin Hotels San Francisco (San Francisco, California)

References

External links 

H
2010 establishments in New York City
Companies based in Miami
Hotels established in 2010
Hotel chains
Hotel chains in the United States